Estadio de Nervión was a multi-use stadium in Seville, Spain.  It was used mostly for football matches and hosted the home matches of Sevilla FC. The stadium was able to hold 20,000 people and opened in 1928.  It was closed in 1958 when Estadio Ramón Sánchez Pizjuán opened. 

Estadio de Nervión replaced Campo de la Reina Victoria.

References

External links
Estadios de España 

Defunct football venues in Spain
Sports venues completed in 1928